Matthew Baldino is an American lightweight rower. He won a gold medal at the 1974 World Rowing Championships in Lucerne with the lightweight men's eight.

References

Year of birth missing (living people)
American male rowers
World Rowing Championships medalists for the United States
Living people